Mary William Ethelbert Appleton Burke (August 7, 1884 – May 14, 1970) was an American actress who was famous on Broadway and radio, and in silent and sound films. She is best known to modern audiences as Glinda the Good Witch of the North in the Metro-Goldwyn-Mayer movie musical The Wizard of Oz (1939).

Burke was nominated for the Academy Award for Best Supporting Actress for her performance as Emily Kilbourne in Merrily We Live (1938). She is also remembered for her appearances in the Topper film series. Her unmistakable high-pitched, quivering and aristocratic voice, made her a frequent choice to play dimwitted or spoiled society types.

She was married to Broadway producer and impresario Florenz Ziegfeld Jr. from 1914 until his death in 1932.

Early life
Burke was born in Washington, D.C., the daughter of Blanche (née Beatty) and her second husband, William "Billy" Ethelbert Burke. She toured the United States and Europe with her father, a singer and clown who worked for the Barnum & Bailey Circus. Her family settled in London where she attended plays in the West End. She began acting on stage in 1903, making her debut in London in The School Girl. Her other London shows included The Duchess of Dantzic (1903) and The Blue Moon (1904). She eventually returned to America to star in Broadway musical comedies.

Career

Burke went on to play leads on Broadway in Mrs. Dot, Suzanne, The Runaway, The "Mind-the-Paint" Girl, and The Land of Promise from 1910 to 1913, along with a supporting role in the revival of Sir Arthur Wing Pinero's The Amazons. There she met producer Florenz Ziegfeld, marrying him in 1914. Two years later they had a daughter, author Patricia Ziegfeld Stephenson (1916–2008).

Burke was signed for the movies and made her cinematic debut in the title role of Peggy (1915). Her success was phenomenal, and she was soon earning what was reputedly the highest salary of any film actress up to that time. She followed her first feature with the 15-part serial Gloria's Romance (1916), another popular and critically acclaimed vehicle. By 1917, she was a favorite with silent-movie fans, rivaling Mary Pickford, Lillian Gish, Clara Kimball Young and Irene Castle. She starred primarily in provocative society dramas and comedies, similar in theme to The "Mind-the-Paint" Girl, her most successful American play. Her girlish charm rivaled her acting ability, and as she dressed to the hilt in fashionable gowns, furs and jewelry, her clothes sense also won her the devotion of female audiences. Among the films in which she appeared during this period were Arms and the Girl (1917), The Mysterious Miss Terry, Let's Get a Divorce (1918), Good Gracious, Annabelle (1919), Away Goes Prudence (1920) and The Frisky Mrs. Johnson (1920). As a nod to himself for his wife appearing for Zukor and Lasky, Ziegfeld insisted on promotions for each of the films to carry the tag 'By Special Arrangement with Florenz Ziegfeld'.

Burke's beauty and taste made her a major trendsetter throughout the 1910s and 20s. As early as 1909, following her Broadway performance in My Wife (1909), department stores began carrying the "Billie Burke Dress" with a signature flat collar and lace trim. During this time, much of Burke's on- and off-screen wardrobe was provided by the leading European couturier Lucile (in private life, Lady Duff Gordon), whose New York branch was the fashion Mecca of socialites and entertainment celebrities. Burke reflected on her reputation as "a new kind of actress, carefree, and red-headed, and I had beautiful clothes."

In 1916, Burke had a daughter. In 1917, Burke endorsed Pond’s Vanishing Cream.

Despite her success in film, Burke eventually returned to the stage, appearing in Caesar's Wife (1919), The Intimate Strangers (1921), The Marquise (1927) and The Happy Husband (1928). 

Burke made her Hollywood comeback in 1932, when she starred as Margaret Fairfield in A Bill of Divorcement, which was directed by George Cukor. She played Katharine Hepburn's mother in the film, which was Hepburn's debut. Despite the death of her husband Florenz Ziegfeld during the film's production, she resumed acting shortly after his funeral.

In 1933, Burke was cast as Millicent Jordan, a scatterbrained high-society woman hosting a dinner party in the comedy Dinner at Eight, directed by George Cukor, co-starring with Lionel Barrymore, Marie Dressler, John Barrymore, Jean Harlow and Wallace Beery. The movie was a great success and revitalized her career. She subsequently starred in many comedies and musicals, typecast as a ditzy, feather-brained upper-class matron, with her high-pitched voice.

In 1936, Metro-Goldwyn-Mayer filmed a biopic of Florenz Ziegfeld (The Great Ziegfeld), a film that won Academy Awards for Best Picture and Best Actress (Luise Rainer as Ziegfeld's common-law wife, Anna Held). William Powell played Ziegfeld and Myrna Loy played Burke; this infuriated Burke, who was under contract to the studio and believed she could have played herself, however, MGM considered her too old to cast in the part of her younger self. 

Burke appeared in Topper (1937) in which she played the twittering and puritanical Clara Topper, who is married to a man haunted by socialite ghosts played by Cary Grant and Constance Bennett. She returned to the role in the film's sequels. Her next performance as Emily Kilbourne in Merrily We Live (1938) resulted in her only Oscar nomination. In 1938, she was chosen to play Glinda the Good Witch of the North in the musical The Wizard of Oz (1939), directed by Victor Fleming, starring Judy Garland. She had previously worked with Garland in the film Everybody Sing, in which she played Judy's histrionically hysterical actress-mother. Director George Cukor offered her the role of Aunt Pittypat in Gone With the Wind (1939), but she declined it. The role went to Laura Hope Crews, in a performance that Cukor wanted to be played in a "Billie Burke-ish manner" with "the same zany feeling". Another successful film series followed with Father of the Bride (1950) and Father's Little Dividend (1951), both directed by Vincente Minnelli and starring Spencer Tracy, Joan Bennett, and Elizabeth Taylor. Burke also portrayed Mrs. Ernest (Daisy) Stanley in the 1942 film The Man Who Came to Dinner.

Burke wrote two autobiographies, both with Cameron Shipp, With a Feather on My Nose (Appleton 1949) and With Powder on My Nose (Coward McCann, 1959).

Radio and television

On CBS Radio, The Billie Burke Show was heard on Saturday mornings from April 3, 1943, until September 21, 1946. Sponsored by Listerine, this situation comedy was initially titled Fashions in Rations during its first year. Portraying herself as a featherbrained Good Samaritan who lived "in the little white house on Sunnyview Lane," she always offered a helping hand to those in her neighborhood. She worked often in early television, appearing in the short-lived sitcom Doc Corkle (1952). She was a guest star on several TV and radio series, including Duffy's Tavern.

On television, Burke starred in her own talk show, At Home With Billie Burke, which ran on the DuMont Television Network from June 1951 through the spring of 1952. She was one of the first female talk show hosts, after the hostesses of the earlier DuMont series And Everything Nice (1949–50) and Fashions on Parade (1948–49) which both included some talk show segments.

Billie Burke starred in an adaptation of Dr. Heidegger's Experiment on the TV version of Lights Out on November 20, 1950.

Return to stage and final film
Burke tried to make a comeback on the New York stage. She starred in two short-lived productions: This Rock and Mrs. January and Mr. X. Although she got good reviews, the plays did not. She also appeared in several plays in California, although her mind became clouded, and she had trouble remembering lines. In the late 1950s, her failing memory led to her retirement from show business, although her explanation at the time was, "Acting just wasn't any fun anymore."

Burke made her final screen appearance in Sergeant Rutledge (1960), a western directed by John Ford.

Personal life

Among Burke's early suitors was the operatic tenor Enrico Caruso. 

In 1910, Burke bought the Kirkham estate on Broadway in Hastings-on-Hudson, New York, and renamed the mansion, Burkeley Crest.

In April 1914, Burke married Florenz Ziegfeld.

In 1921, Burke retired to raise her daughter Patricia, but resumed work after the Wall Street Crash of 1929.

In 1932, Burke moved from New York to Beverly Hills, California, after the death of Ziegfeld.

Burke died in Los Angeles of natural causes on May 14, 1970, at the age of 85, and she was interred beside
Ziegfeld at Kensico Cemetery, Valhalla, Westchester County, New York.

Legacy
For many years, Burke's framed photo was displayed above the exit staircase at New York City's Ziegfeld Theatre, but it disappeared after renovations. An opening-night program bearing a picture of her from her 1912 triumph The Mind The Paint Girl (Sir Arthur Wing Pinero) is displayed in the lobby of the Lyceum Theatre in Manhattan.

For her contributions to the film industry, Burke was inducted into the Hollywood Walk of Fame in 1960 with a motion pictures star at 6617 Hollywood Boulevard.

The Academy Film Archive houses the Florenz Ziegfeld-Billie Burke Collection, which consists primarily of home movies.

On November 4, 2015, the crater Burke, near the north pole of the planet Mercury, was named after Billie Burke.

Performance career

Radio

 The Ziegfeld Follies of the Air – 1932
 Doubting Thomas - 1935
 Good News of 1939 – 1938
 The Rudy Vallee Hour – 1939
 The Gulf Screen Guild Theater – 1939
 The Rudy Vallee Sealtest Show – 1940–41
 The Pepsodent Show – 1941
 The Billie Burke Show – 1943–1946
 Duffy's Tavern – 1944
 The Sealtest Village Store – 1944
 Mail Call – 1944
 The Charlie McCarthy Show – 1944–47
 Tribute to Ethel Barrymore – 1945
 The Rudy Vallee Show – 1945
 Show Stoppers – 1946
 The Danny Kaye Show – 1946
 WOR 25th Anniversary – 1947
 Your Movietown Radio Theatre – 1948
 The Eddie Cantor Pabst Blue Ribbon Show – 1948
 Family Theater – 1948–52
 This Is Show Business – CBS-TV, 1949
 The Martin and Lewis Show – 1949
 The Bill Stern Colgate Sports Newsreel – 1949
 Stagestruck – 1954
 Biography in Sound – 1955–56

Broadway

 My Wife – 1907
 Love Watches – 1908
 Mrs. Dot – 1910
 Suzanne – 1910
 The Philosopher in the Apple Orchard – 1911
 The Runaway – 1911
 The Amazons – 1913
 The Land of Promise – 1913
 Jerry – 1914
 The Rescuing Angel – 1917
 A Marriage of Convenience – 1918
 Caesar's Wife – 1919
 The Intimate Strangers (musical)|The Intimate Strangers – 1921
 Rose Briar – 1922
 Annie Dear – 1924
 The Marquise – 1927
 The Happy Husband – 1928
 Family Affairs – 1929
 The Truth Game – 1930
 Ziegfeld Follies of 1934 – 1934
 Ziegfeld Follies of 1936 – 1936
 This Rock – 1943
 Ziegfeld Follies of 1943 – 1943

Filmography

Silent
Our Mutual Girl (1914) as Herself
Peggy (1916) as Peggy Cameron
Gloria's Romance (1916) as Gloria Stafford 
The Mysterious Miss Terry (1917) as Mavis Terry
Arms and the Girl (1917) as Ruth Sherwood
The Land of Promise (1917) as Nora Marsh
Eve's Daughter (1918) as Irene Simpson-Bates
Let's Get a Divorce (1918) as Mme. Cyprienne Marcey
In Pursuit of Polly (1918) as Polly Marsden
The Make-Believe Wife (1918) as Phyllis Ashbrook
Good Gracious, Annabelle (1919) as Annabelle Leigh
The Misleading Widow (1919) as Betty Taradine
Sadie Love (1919) as Sadie Love
Wanted: A Husband (1919) as Amanda Darcy Cole
Away Goes Prudence (1920) as Prudence Thorne
The Frisky Mrs. Johnson (1920) as Belle Johnson
The Education of Elizabeth (1921) as Elizabeth Banks

Sound
Glorifying the American Girl (1929) as Herself (uncredited)
A Bill of Divorcement (1932) as Margaret
Christopher Strong (1933) as Lady Strong - His Wife
Dinner at Eight (1933) as Millicent Jordan
Only Yesterday (1933) as Julia Warren
Where Sinners Meet (1934) as Eustasia
Finishing School (1934) as Her Mother / Mrs. Helen Crawford Radcliff
We're Rich Again (1934) as Mrs. Linda Page
Forsaking All Others (1934) as Aunt Paula
Society Doctor (1935) as Mrs. Crane
After Office Hours (1935) as Mrs. Norwood
Becky Sharp (1935) as Lady Bareacres
Doubting Thomas (1935) as Paula Brown
She Couldn't Take It (1935) as Mrs. Daniel Van Dyke
A Feather in Her Hat (1935) as Julia Trent Anders
Splendor (1935) as Clarissa
My American Wife (1936) as Mrs. Robert Cantillon
Piccadilly Jim (1936) as Eugenia Willis, Nesta's Sister
Craig's Wife (1936) as Mrs. Frazier
Parnell (1937) as Clara Wood
Topper (1937) as Mrs. Topper
The Bride Wore Red (1937) as Contessa di Meina
Navy Blue and Gold (1937) as Mrs. Alyce Gates

Everybody Sing (1938) as Diana Bellaire
Merrily We Live (1938) as Mrs. Kilbourne
The Young in Heart (1938) as Marmy Carleton
Topper Takes a Trip (1939) as Mrs. Topper
Zenobia (1939) as Mrs. Tibbett
Bridal Suite (1939) as Mrs. McGill
The Wizard of Oz (1939) as Glinda the Good Witch of the North
Eternally Yours (1939) as Aunt Abby
Remember? (1939) as Mrs. Bronson
The Ghost Comes Home (1940) as Cora Adams
And One Was Beautiful (1940) as Mrs. Julia Lattimer
Irene (1940) as Mrs. Vincent
The Captain Is a Lady (1940) as Blossy Stort
Dulcy (1940) as Eleanor Forbes
Hullabaloo (1940) as Penny Merriweather
The Wild Man of Borneo (1941) as Bernice Marshall
Topper Returns (1941) as Mrs. Topper
One Night in Lisbon (1941) as Catherine Enfilden
The Man Who Came to Dinner (1942) as Daisy Stanley 
What's Cookin'? (1942) as Agatha Courtney
In This Our Life (1942) as Lavinia Timberlake
They All Kissed the Bride (1942) as Mrs. Drew
Girl Trouble (1942) as Mrs. Rowland
Hi Diddle Diddle (1943) as Liza Prescott
So's Your Uncle (1943) as Aunt Minerva
You're a Lucky Fellow, Mr. Smith (1943) as Aunt Harriet Crandall
Gildersleeve on Broadway (1943) as Mrs. Laura Chandler
Swing Out, Sister (1945) as Jessica Mariman
The Cheaters (1945) as Clara Pidgeon
Breakfast in Hollywood (1946) as Mrs. Frances Cartwright
The Bachelor's Daughters (1946) as Molly Burns
Billie Gets Her Man (1948, short) as Billie Baxter
The Barkleys of Broadway (1949) as Mrs. Livingston Belney
And Baby Makes Three (1949) as Mrs. Marvin Fletcher
 The Boy from Indiana (1950) as Zelda Bagley
Father of the Bride (1950) as Doris Dunstan
Three Husbands (1950) as Mrs. Jenny Bard Whittaker
Father's Little Dividend (1951) as Doris Dunstan
Small Town Girl (1953) as Mrs. Livingston
The Young Philadelphians (1959) as Mrs. J. Arthur Allen
Sergeant Rutledge (1960) as Mrs. Cordelia Fosgate
Pepe (1960) as Herself

See also

Academy of Music/Riviera Theatre
List of actors with Academy Award nominations

References

Further reading
 
Burke, Billie. With a Feather on my Nose. (First ed.) New York: Appleton-Century-Crofts, 1948. .
Burke, Billie. With Powder on my Nose (First ed.) New York, Coward-McCann, Inc. 1959

External links

 
 
 AllMovie.com
 Billie Burke still photos from several Billie plays and lost Billie silent films Univ. of Washington Sayre collection
 Billie Burke  photos Univ. of Louisville Macauley Collection
 Flo Ziegfeld-Billie Burke Papers, 1907-1984, held by the Billy Rose Theatre Division, New York Public Library for the Performing Arts
 Billie Burke Digital Image Gallery, Billy Rose Theatre Division, New York Public Library for the Performing Arts
 Billie Burke Collection, held by the Howard Gotlieb Archival Research Center, Boston University
 Literature on Billie Burke
 Billie Burke with one of her motorcars, a Rolls-Royce

1884 births
1970 deaths
20th-century American actresses
Actresses from Washington, D.C.
Actresses from Beverly Hills, California
American film actresses
American musical theatre actresses
American radio personalities
American silent film actresses
American stage actresses
American television actresses
Deaths from dementia in California
Vaudeville performers
Burials at Kensico Cemetery
Ziegfeld girls
Metro-Goldwyn-Mayer contract players